Kentland is a town in Jefferson Township, Newton County, in the U.S. state of Indiana. The population was 1,641 at the 2020 census.

History
The town was founded in 1860 as "Kent", though this name was soon lengthened to Kentland. The name honors Alexander J. Kent, who acquired the then marshy plat and prepared it for development. The town is the county seat of Newton County.

Kentland is the birthplace of famous turn-of-the-century humorist George Ade, author of such plays as The College Widow, Artie, and The Sultan of Sulu. Purdue University's Ross–Ade Stadium, home of the Boilermakers football team, is named for him and fellow Purdue benefactor David Ross. Disgraced Indiana governor Warren McCray, convicted of mail fraud and forced to resign in 1924, also hailed from Kentland.

The Newton County Courthouse was listed on the National Register of Historic Places in 2008.

Geography

The Kentland crater, a probable meteorite impact crater, is located between Kentland and Goodland.

Demographics

2010 census
As of the census of 2010, there were 1,748 people, 695 households, and 450 families living in the town. The racial makeup of the town was 94.2% White, 0.8% African American, 0.1% Native American, 0.5% Asian, 2.6% from other races, and 1.8% from two or more races. Hispanic or Latino of any race were 8.0% of the population.

There were 695 households, of which 30.5% had children under the age of 18 living with them, 46.9% were married couples living together, 11.9% had a female householder with no husband present, 5.9% had a male householder with no wife present, and 35.3% were non-families. 30.9% of all households were made up of individuals, and 13.4% had someone living alone who was 65 years of age or older. The average household size was 2.46 and the average family size was 3.02.

The median age in the town was 40.9 years. 24.7% of residents were under the age of 18; 7.7% were between the ages of 18 and 24; 21.4% were from 25 to 44; 30.3% were from 45 to 64; and 15.8% were 65 years of age or older. The gender makeup of the town was 49.0% male and 51.0% female.

2000 census
As of the census of 2000, there were 1,822 people, 733 households, and 477 families living in the town. The racial makeup of the town was 98.30% White, 0.11% African American, 0.27% Asian, 0.82% from other races, and 0.49% from two or more races. Hispanic or Latino of any race were 2.96% of the population.

There were 733 households, out of which 29.7% had children under the age of 18 living with them, 50.3% were married couples living together, 10.8% had a female householder with no husband present, and 34.9% were non-families. 30.4% of all households were made up of individuals, and 14.3% had someone living alone who was 65 years of age or older. The average household size was 2.42 and the average family size was 3.03.

In the town, the population was spread out, with 24.7% under the age of 18, 9.4% from 18 to 24, 27.2% from 25 to 44, 22.1% from 45 to 64, and 16.6% who were 65 years of age or older. The median age was 39 years. For every 100 females there were 96.8 males. For every 100 females age 18 and over, there were 90.3 males.

The median income for a household in the town was $34,732, and the median income for a family was $45,043. Males had a median income of $32,734 versus $20,714 for females. The per capita income for the town was $17,797. About 4.7% of families and 7.5% of the population were below the poverty line, including 5.6% of those under age 18 and 13.8% of those age 65 or over.

Education
The town has a lending library, the Kentland-Jefferson Township Public Library.

Notable people
 George Ade, columnist and author; Ross–Ade Stadium at Purdue University is named for him.
Alice Chancellor, Army engineer
 Jethro A. Hatch, was the first physician in Kentland and a U.S. Representative from Indiana.
 Warren T. McCray, 30th Governor of Indiana.
 Tracy Smith, former Arizona State baseball coach.

Gallery

References

 George Pence and Nellie C. Armstrong (1933).  Indiana Boundaries: Territory, State and County.  Indiana Historical Society.

External links

 "Warren T. McCray" https://web.archive.org/web/20081204174258/http://www.countyhistory.com/doc.gov/033.htm
 "Earth Impact Database: Kentland" https://www.unb.ca/passc/ImpactDatabase/images/kentland.htm
 "South Newton High School" http://www.newton.k12.in.us

Towns in Newton County, Indiana
County seats in Indiana
Northwest Indiana
Populated places established in 1860
1860 establishments in Indiana
Towns in Indiana